The Salt Lake Bees are a Minor League Baseball team of the Pacific Coast League (PCL) and the Triple-A affiliate of the Los Angeles Angels. They are located in Salt Lake City, Utah, and play their home games at Smith's Ballpark. The ballpark opened in 1994 and has a seating capacity of 15,411, the largest in their league. The team was previously known as the Salt Lake Buzz (1994–2000) and Salt Lake Stingers (2001–2005) before adopting their Bees moniker in 2006. They have competed in the PCL since 1994, including the 2021 season when it was known as the Triple-A West.

History

Prior professional baseball in Salt Lake City
After the 1914 Pacific Coast League season, Salt Lake City businessman Bill "Hardpan" Lane purchased the Sacramento Solons and brought the team to Utah as the Salt Lake City Bees. Though a charter member of the PCL, the Solons suffered on the field and at the gate, being exiled at times to Tacoma, Fresno, and San Francisco. On March 31, 1915, their first game was played with 10,000 fans pouring into Majestic Park (later renamed Bonneville Park) to cheer the Bees to a 9–3 win over the Vernon Tigers.[Salt Lake Telegram, April 1, 1915, p. 3]

The original Bees never won a PCL pennant, but they did draw attendees well, especially considering the small market size. Other PCL team owners, though, resented the high cost of travel to Salt Lake City. When the Vernon Tigers abandoned Los Angeles after the 1925 season, it was suggested to Lane that he would do well to transfer his team to southern California. So after eleven seasons, the Bees moved to Los Angeles for the 1926 season. At first known as the Hollywood Bees, the team soon became the Hollywood Stars. After ten seasons in Hollywood, the team transferred again, to San Diego, where it played as the San Diego Padres from 1936 to 1968. Salt Lake City was without a baseball team until 1946 when it received a franchise in the Pioneer League.

Salt Lake Bees (1994–present)

The current franchise dates from 1994, when Joe Buzas, a former major league player and the owner of the PCL Portland Beavers, moved the team to Salt Lake City. Buzas made a deal wherein the city would build a new ballpark on the site of historic Derks Field in exchange for relocating the team. The new ballpark, Franklin Quest Field, opened in 1994 with the renamed Salt Lake Buzz drawing 713,224 fans to home games during their inaugural season—breaking the PCL single-season attendance record that had stood for 48 years. Buzas owned the team until his death in 2003. The team was purchased by Larry H. Miller, who also owned the NBA's Utah Jazz. Miller died in February 2009, and the team was owned by his widow, Gail Miller until it was sold to Ryan Smith in 2021.

Known as the Salt Lake Buzz from 1994 to 2000, the team changed its name to the Salt Lake Stingers in 2001. The change was forced by a trademark dilution lawsuit filed by Georgia Tech, whose yellowjacket mascot is named Buzz.

Following the 2005 season, the team announced the Stingers would henceforth be known as the Salt Lake Bees, the name of the original PCL franchise which played in Salt Lake City from 1915 to 1926 and from 1958 to 1965. The team also chose a logo, jersey, and color scheme similar to the latter Bees PCL franchise. Bees have long been a symbol of Utah. The original name of the Mormon settlement, Deseret, is said to be the word for "honeybee" in the Book of Mormon; a beehive appears on the Utah state flag; the state motto is "Industry" (for which bees are known); and Utah is widely known as the "Beehive State."

In 2019, the Bees announced a new logo, name, and branding for the team, taking on the name "Abejas de Salt Lake" for their ongoing participation in The Copa de la Diversión.

In conjunction with Major League Baseball's restructuring of Minor League Baseball in 2021, the Bees were organized into the Triple-A West. Salt Lake ended the season in fifth place in the Western Division with a 49–70 record. No playoffs were held to determine a league champion; instead, the team with the best regular-season record was declared the winner. However, 10 games that had been postponed from the start of the season were reinserted into the schedule as a postseason tournament called the Triple-A Final Stretch in which all 30 Triple-A clubs competed for the highest winning percentage. Salt Lake finished the tournament tied for seventh place with a 6–4 record. In 2022, the Triple-A West became known as the Pacific Coast League, the name historically used by the regional circuit prior to the 2021 reorganization.

On January 17, 2023, the Larry H. Miller Company announced they would build a new baseball stadium in Daybreak, a master-planned community in South Jordan, Utah, for the Salt Lake Bees. Construction on the privately financed stadium is expected to begin in 2023 and be completed in time for the 2025 season. The Bees will continue playing at Smith's Ballpark until the current lease expires in fall 2024.

Season-by-season records

Roster

Notable past players

 Bernardo Brito
 Chone Figgins
 LaTroy Hawkins
 John Lackey
 David Ortiz
 Todd Walker
 Kendrys Morales
 Jered Weaver
 Nick Adenhart
 Joe Saunders
 Howie Kendrick
 Mike Trout

Venue
The Bees play at Smith's Ballpark. It was formerly known as Franklin Covey Field. It was renamed in 2014.

Mascot
The team mascot is a large bee named Bumble.

References

External links
 
 Sanborn map showing Salt Lake ballpark, 1911
 Includes picture of early ballpark
 Sanborn map showing Salt Palace, 1911, which became the site of the PCL ballpark
 Sanborn map showing part of Derks Field, 1950

 
Baseball teams established in 1994
Pacific Coast League teams
Sports in Salt Lake City
Bees
Professional baseball teams in Utah
1994 establishments in Utah
Triple-A West teams